Bala Alhassan Dahir (born 5 March 1988) is a Nigerian footballer who last played as a midfielder for ARA FC.

Career statistics

Club

Notes

References

1995 births
Living people
Ivorian footballers
Ivorian expatriate footballers
Association football defenders
Association football midfielders
Lobi Stars F.C. players
RoundGlass Punjab FC players
I-League 2nd Division players
I-League players
Expatriate footballers in Bhutan
Ivorian expatriate sportspeople in India
Expatriate footballers in India
Peerless SC players